Shaista Pervaiz Malik is a Pakistani politician who has been a member of the National Assembly of Pakistan since December 2021. Previously she was a member of the National Assembly from June 2013 to May 2018 and from August 2018 to October 2021.

Political career
She was elected to the National Assembly of Pakistan as a candidate of Pakistan Muslim League (N) (PML-N) on a seat reserved for women from Punjab in 2013 Pakistani general election.

She was re-elected to the National Assembly as a candidate of PML-N on a reserved seat for women from Punjab in 2018 Pakistani general election. She vacated seat in October 2021 to contest NA 133 by elections.

She contested NA-133 By polls held on 5 December 2021 and won by margins of 14,498 defeating PPP Aslam Gill.

References

Living people
Pakistan Muslim League (N) MNAs
Pakistani MNAs 2013–2018
Pakistani MNAs 2018–2023
Punjabi people
Women members of the National Assembly of Pakistan
Year of birth missing (living people)
21st-century Pakistani women politicians